Beauty? is an album by Sound of the Blue Heart, released by Triple X Records in 2006.

Track listing
"Great Escape"
"Beauty?"
"Mad, Mad World"
"He's Forgotten How to Dream"
"River of Love"
"Love and It's Sorrow"
"I Cannot Look Away"
"Can't Get It Out of My Head"
"Elizabeth's Song"
"In an Empty Heart"
"Pantomime Clown"

2006 albums